Ashley, is a restaurant chain based in South Korea owned by the E-Land. As of 2014, the chain had over 140 retail stores in South Korea. Ashley is a buffet which specialises in beef and steak.

References

External links
 

South Korean brands
Restaurant chains in South Korea